The Hong Kong Film Award for Best Actress is an award presented annually at the Hong Kong Film Awards (HKFA). It is given to honour an actress who has delivered an outstanding performance in a Hong Kong film. The 1st Hong Kong Film Awards ceremony was held in 1982, with no formal nomination procedure established; the award was given to Kara Hui for her role in My Young Auntie. After the first award ceremony, a nomination system was put in place whereby no more than five nominations are made for each category and each entry is selected through two rounds of voting. Firstly, prospective nominees are marked with a weight of 50% each from HKFA voters and a hundred professional adjudicators, contributing towards a final score with which the top five nominees advance to the second round of voting. The winner is then selected via a scoring process where 55% of the vote comes from 55 professional adjudicators, 25% from representatives of the Hong Kong Performing Artistes Guild and 20% from all other HKFA Executive Committee Members.

Maggie Cheung holds the title of the most awards received having been honoured on five separate occasions. Sylvia Chang holds the record for the most nominated actress with eleven nominations. Since its inception, 81 actresses have been nominated for the award with 26 actresses winning at least one of the 36 awards.

Winners and nominees
In the following table award nominees are listed by year corresponding to the Hong Kong Film Awards' annual presentation ceremony. At the first incarnation of the ceremony in 1982 awards were presented to winners with no nominees selected. Thereafter, the winner is chosen from a list of nominees from the chosen category.

Multiple wins and nominations

The following individuals received two or more Best Actress awards:

The following individuals received five or more Best Actress nominations:

Age superlatives

Notes
 A film is considered to be a "Hong Kong film" by meeting at least 2 of the following criteria:
The film's director is a Hong Kong resident that holds a Hong Kong Identity Card
At least one of the film's production companies are legally registered in Hong Kong SAR. 
At least one person involved in the film's production from any six separate award categories who are Hong Kong resident holding a Hong Kong Identity Card.

References

Bibliography

External links
 Hong Kong Film Awards Official Site

Film awards for lead actress
Awards established in 1982
Hong Kong Film Awards